Rabbit and the Moon is a 1998 children's picture book by Douglas Wood and illustrated by Leslie Baker. It is an adaption of a Cree legend about how Rabbit reached the Moon, and how the Whooping crane got its long legs and red head marking.

Reception
Booklist, in a review of Rabbit and the Moon, wrote "The watercolor illustrations have a fuzzy, sleepy quality, yet are clear enough that the animals depict a range of emotions .. The story itself is told in fairly short, easy-to-understand sentences, making this a good a choice for a bedtime story or for older students studying folktales." and School Library Journal called it a "satisfying story", but "An uneven offering."

Kirkus Reviews was somewhat critical, writing, "Though Wood pays homage to Rabbit as a trickster in the source note, there's no mischief in the story and Rabbit is portrayed as polite and unassuming. Baker's watercolors are another disappointment; Rabbit's limbs change length and proportions unpredictably, so that sometimes his shape is that of a natural-looking rabbit, and other times that of a human child in a fur suit."

Rabbit and the Moon has also been reviewed by The Horn Book Magazine, and Publishers Weekly.

References

1998 anthologies
1998 children's books
American children's books
American picture books
Fantasy books
Cree culture
English-language books
Works based on legends
Books about rabbits and hares
Books about birds
Books about night
Works about the Moon
Forests in fiction